The 30th Space Communications Squadron (30 SCS) is a United States Space Force (USSF) unit. 30 SCS is assigned to Space Launch Delta 30 at Vandenberg Space Force Base, California, under the Space Systems Command (SSC) Field Command.  30 SCS is responsible for providing cyber, communications, and mobile optics support to Space Launch Delta 30 and Vandenberg Space Force Base tenant units.

Mission 
[Be the Best] - Provide superior cyber and mobile optics capabilities through responsive and secure delivery of voice, video, and data information services and technologies.

Vision 
[Stay the Best] - Be the USSF leader in cyber and mobile optics capability.  Deliver increased capacity, utility, and flexibility to rapidly meet all mission requirements.

Motto 
One force, many strengths!

Emblems

Current Emblem 
The current 30 SCS emblem was adopted in 2021.  The full color version is used for all official documents, signage, and wear on USSF uniforms.  The subdued color version is used for wear on USAF uniforms.

Current Emblem Significance Statement 
The prominent gold border represents Space Systems Command, the USSF Field Command to which the 30th Space Communications Squadron is assigned.  The divided oval symbolizes day and night and indicates the twenty-four hour services provided by the 30 SCS. The gryphons, a mythological combination of two creatures, mighty in their own domains, represent the strength, diversity and teamwork of the squadron in the accomplishment of its missions. The three lightning bolts denote visual, voice and data services and reflect the power and synergy released by 30 SCS unity and teamwork. The larger star represents the mission. The other three smaller stars indicate the personnel; military, government civilian, and contract support of the organization. Together, they suggest the direction and vision of the squadron's goals.

Previous Emblems

Mascot (Gryphon) 

The gryphon, a mythological combination of two creatures, mighty in their own domains, represent the strength, diversity and teamwork of the 30 SCS in the accomplishment of their missions.

Reporting Chain and Squadron Structure 
USSF Field Command -- Space Systems Command (SSC)
 USSF Delta -- Space Launch Delta 30 (SLD 30)
 USSF Squadron—30th Space Communications Squadron (30 SCS)
Operations Flight (30 SCS/SCO)
Plans and Resources Flight (30 SCS/SCX)
Special Missions Flight (30 SCS/SCP)

History 
The 30th Space Communications Squadron was originally constituted as the 30th Communications Squadron on 8 October 1946.  The squadron was assigned to Andrews Field (became Andrews Air Force Base 24 June 1948), Maryland, and was attached to the 3902nd Air Base Wing of Strategic Air Command and activated on 17 October 1946 until 16 August 1950. The unit was later redesignated as the 30th Communications Squadron on 8 November 1954. The unit transferred and garrisoned at Offutt Air Force Base, Nebraska on 9 November 1948 until 1 October 1970.  While assigned to Offutt Air Force Base, the unit was redesignated as the 1st Communications Squadron and later redesignated as the 1st Aerospace Communications Group, on 1 February 1960 until the unit was inactivated on 1 October 1970.  The unit reconstituted, and redesignated at Vandenberg Air Force Base as the 30th Communications Squadron, on 1 Nov 1991 and was assigned to the 30th Logistics Group on 15 Mar 1999 (later the Logistics Group became the 30th Maintenance Group, on 1 Oct 2002), then reassigned to the 30 Operations Group on 1 Dec 2003.  With the establishment of the United States Space Force, the organizational hierarchy eliminated the group echelon, and the squadron became a direct report to HQ Space Launch Delta 30 on 14 May 2021.

Lineage

Stations

List of commanders

See also 
Space Launch Delta 30
Space Systems Command

References

External links
 

United States Space Force
Vandenberg Space Force Base
Military education and training in the United States